Kakamega School, formerly known as Government African School Kakamega and Kakamega High School, is a four-year high school in Kakamega, Western Kenya, founded in 1932.

Mr. Harold Arthur Waterloo Chapman, a graduate of University of Oxford, was made the school principal in August 1931 before its completion and commissioning. He served as the school principal until 1955 when he retired. He later died on the 25 January 1988.

Chapman left a permanent mark in Kakamega school where his name was synonymous with the school. A hostel located to the SOWETO side of the boarding section was named after him, and is one of the most popular hostels housing both junior and senior students. To this date, the school is referred to as Chapman's land as mentioned in the school anthem.

Kakamega school is currently categorized by the Ministry of Education as a national school and admits students from across Kenya. However, even before its elevation to a national school, the school would enrol students from every part of the country based on its popularity.

Notable alumni 

 Moody Awori – 10th Vice President of Kenya
 Najib Balala – Secretary for Tourism
 Yusuf Chanzu – M.P. for the Vihiga Constituency
 Bonny Khalwale – former senator representing Kakamega county
 Newton Kulundu – former Minister for Labour
 Kenneth Marende – former Speaker of the National Assembly of Kenya
 Dennis Oliech – international footballer
 Noah Wekesa – former Minister for Wildlife and Forestry

See also

 Education in Kenya
 List of schools in Kenya

External links 
 , the school's official website

Kakamega
High schools and secondary schools in Kenya
Education in Western Province (Kenya)
1932 establishments in the British Empire
1930s establishments in Kenya
Educational institutions established in 1932